The mnemonic peg system, invented by Henry Herdson is a memory aid that works by creating mental associations between two concrete objects in a one-to-one fashion that will later be applied to to-be-remembered information.  Typically this involves linking nouns to numbers and it is common practice to choose a noun that rhymes with the number it is associated with.  These will be the pegs of the system. These associations have to be memorized one time and can be applied repeatedly to new information that needs to be memorized.

Types of peg-word systems

Rhyming peg-word system
The Rhyming peg-word system is very simple, as stated above and could look something like this:
 Bun: Visualize an association between the first item and a bun
 Shoe: Visualize an association between the second item and a shoe
 Tree: Visualize an association between the third item and a tree
 Door: Visualize an association between the fourth item and a door
 Hive: Visualize an association between the fifth item and a bee hive
 Bricks: Visualize an association between the sixth item and bricks
 Heaven: Visualize an association between the seventh item and Heaven
 Gate: Visualize an association between the eighth item and a gate
 Wine: Visualize an association between the ninth item and wine
 Hen: Visualize an association between the tenth item and a chicken.

For example, to remember the following grocery list of 10 items:
 Apple: Picture an apple eating a bun
 Butter: Picture a pad of butter melting on a shoe
 Batteries: Picture a tree with batteries for leaves
 Soap: Picture a door made from soap
 Bread: Picture bees flying from a loaf of bread as if it is a hive
 Milk: Picture a brick house with milk jugs where the bricks should be
 Cat food: Picture an open can of cat food with angel wings and a halo
 Lemons: Picture an elephant-sized lemon (with arms, legs and a hat) falling through a gate
 Coffee: Picture burning your hands on a wine glass with hot coffee in it
 Eggs: Picture an egg cracking and a hen popping out.

The next step is to link the items with some sort of dramatic action, in order to record the order in which they appear. For example:
 After the apple eats the bun 
 it starts eating a stick of butter.
 The butter melts into a pool, in the middle of which sprouts a tree growing batteries.
 A door materializes in the trunk of the tree, opens, and out walks a bar of soap.
 The soap falls over and turns into a loaf of bread around which bees start flying
 etc etc

The less likely you are to have seen the scene in real life, the more likely it is to make a reliably retrievable impression. 

To optimize efficiency, if you were memorizing a shopping list, you would memorize the items in the order in which you would encounter them at the supermarket  - the apple(s) with the lemon(s) and the butter with the milk and eggs, etc.. 

An additional layer of agility could also be achieved by setting each of the above scenes in their corresponding location in the supermarket.

Major system

While it is common to link rhyming nouns with numbers, that is by no means the only system.  There is also the Major system, which connects sounds to numbers. The Major System is more complicated to learn than simple rhymes or alphabetic pegs, because it associates numbers 0-9 with a specific letter or sound, then larger numbers can combine to create words out of the sounds. It is limitless in the number of pegs it can produce. Furthermore, a recent modification to the Major System introduces the concept of dimensions. The most common association between numbers and letters is the following:

0 = s, x, z
1 = t,d
2 = n
3 = m
4 = r
5 = l
6 = sh, ch, j, soft g
7 = c, k, hard g, q
8 = f, v
9 = p, b

This would make the number 33 "MM" which could be made into the word "mom" to better aid in memorization or 92 is "PN" and could become "pen." "Cat" (or "cut") would correspond to 71, as vowels do not have any value.

PAO system

The Person-Action-Object (PAO) system is the most complex. It associates all numbers 00-99 with a distinctive person, action and object.  Any six-digit number can be memorized by using the person assigned the first two digits, the action of the next two digits and the object of the third. For example:

The number 34 could be a person named Frank Sinatra.
13 could be the action of kicking.
79 could be a cape.

This would make the number 341379, Frank Sinatra kicking a cape. Memory grand master, Ed Cooke, reportedly has been working on the Millennium PAO system, which would create an association for all numbers 000-999.

Application
The peg system is commonly used by Mental Athletes for memory competitions for events like card memorization as well as digit memorization.  The peg system has also been applied in a classroom with learning disabled students.  The students that used the peg system performed significantly better than the control in both immediate and delayed tests.

Several studies have investigated the use of this memory mnemonic as a form of an imagery-based memory system within the process of learning a second-language.  For example, if a native English speaker is attempting to learn Spanish, they will notice that the Spanish for duck is pato, which is pronounced similarly to the english word pot.  The individual can develop a mnemonic peg system in order to remember this association by thinking of a duck with a pot on its head.  

One complaint concerning the peg system is that it seems to only be applicable in mundane situations. However, the peg system can be used to remember grocery lists, key points in speeches, and many other lists specific to one's particular area of study or interest. Many recognise that this system can be used to remember a wide variety of objects or information. The peg system works, so long as the information trying to be remembered is specific, able to be visualized, and tied to a unique retrieval cue. This tool of memory can be more efficient than rote memorization.

See also
Method of loci
Mnemonic link system
Mnemonic major system
Mnemonic dominic system
Mnemonic goroawase system
Haraguchi's mnemonic system
Linkword
Memory sport

References

External links

Making pegs from rhymes:
Human Memory
Memory Improvement and Learning Information

Making pegs from shapes:
Human Memory
Memory Improvement and Learning Information

Alphabet Pegs:
Human Memory

Major system peg list
Numzi Peg Words for 0 - 100, with Peg Word Story
Peglist Tutorial
Very personalized Peg list. Up to 100
Peg list up to 1000 pegs

Peg system